Democracy and Education: An Introduction to the Philosophy of Education is a 1916 book by John Dewey.

Synopsis
In Democracy and Education, Dewey argues that the primary ineluctable facts of the birth and death of each one of the constituent members in a social group determine the necessity of education. On one hand, there is the contrast between the immaturity of the new-born members of the group (its future sole representatives) and the maturity of the adult members who possess the knowledge and customs of the group. On the other hand, there is the necessity that these immature members be not merely physically preserved in adequate numbers, but that they be initiated into the interests, purposes, information, skill, and practices of the mature members: otherwise the group will cease its characteristic life.

Dewey observes that even in a "savage" tribe, the achievements of adults are far beyond what the immature members would be capable of if left to themselves. With the growth of civilization, the gap between the original capacities of the immature and the standards and customs of the elders increases. Mere physical growing up and mastery of the bare necessities of subsistence will not suffice to reproduce the life of the group. Deliberate effort and the taking of thoughtful pains are required. Beings who are born not only unaware of, but quite indifferent to, the aims and habits of the social group have to be rendered cognizant of them and actively interested. According to Dewey, education, and education alone, spans the gap.

Reception
Dewey's ideas were never broadly and deeply integrated into the practices of American public schools, though some of his values and terms were widespread. Progressive education (both as espoused by Dewey, and in the more popular and inept forms of which Dewey was critical) was essentially scrapped during the Cold War, when the dominant concern in education was creating and sustaining a scientific and technological elite for military purposes. In the post-Cold War period, however, progressive education had reemerged in many school reform and education theory circles as a thriving field of inquiry learning and inquiry-based science.

Some find it cumbersome that Dewey's philosophical anthropology, unlike Egan, Vico, Ernst Cassirer, Claude Lévi-Strauss, and Nietzsche, does not account for the origin of thought of the modern mind in the aesthetic, more precisely the myth, but instead in the original occupations and industries of ancient people, and eventually in the history of science. A criticism of this approach is that it does not account for the origin of
cultural institutions, which can be accounted for by the aesthetic. Language and its development, in Dewey's philosophical anthropology, have not a central role but are instead a consequence of the cognitive capacity.

Legacy

While Dewey's educational theories have enjoyed a broad popularity during his lifetime and after, they have a troubled history of implementation. Dewey's writings can also be difficult to read, and his tendency to reuse commonplace words and phrases to express extremely complex reinterpretations of them makes him susceptible to misunderstanding. So while he held the role of a leading public intellectual, he was often misinterpreted, even by fellow academics. Many enthusiastically embraced what they mistook for Dewey's philosophy, but which in fact bore little or a distorted resemblance to it.

Simultaneously, other progressive educational theories, often influenced by Dewey but not directly derived from him, were also becoming popular, such as Educational perennialism which is teacher-centered as opposed to student-centered. The term 'progressive education' grew to encompass numerous contradictory theories and practices, as documented by historians like Herbert Kliebard.

Several versions of progressive education succeeded in transforming the educational landscape: the utter ubiquity of guidance counseling, to name but one example, springs from the progressive period. Radical variations of educational progressivism were troubled and short-lived, a fact that supports some understandings of the notion of failure. But they were perhaps too rare and ill-funded to constitute a thorough test.

See also 
List of publications by John Dewey

References

External links 
 
 
 Democracy and Education: An Introduction to the Philosophy of Education public domain book at Wikisource

1916 non-fiction books
Works by John Dewey
Books about education